Flake is a British brand of chocolate bar currently manufactured by British chocolate company Cadbury, owned by Mondelez International, consisting of thinly folded milk chocolate. The bar has a unique crumbly texture, and softens but does not melt when heated.

History
The original Flake product was first developed in 1920 and was discovered by chance by Ralph Thompson, an employee of Cadbury's at the Bournville factory who noticed thin streams of excess chocolate falling from moulds cooled into flaky ripples.

By 1930, Cadbury's was selling half-length Flake specifically for prodding into vanilla soft serve ice cream in a cone ("99 Flakes") which was served by ice cream vendors. First sold in the UK, they would later be sold in Ireland, Australia, South Africa and other nations. The later product, Cadbury Twirl, has two Flake-style bars covered in milk chocolate.

Flakes are no longer manufactured at Bournville and are now made in Dublin, Ireland, and 10th of Ramadan, Egypt.

In 2021 and again in 2022, Mondelez announced that there were shortages of Flakes in the UK and Ireland. In 2021 this was attibuted to high levels of demand due to good weather. In 2022, Mondelez attributed the shortages to "some global supply chain disruptions" alongside demand pressures.

Manufacturing process
Cadbury refers to the exact process of making Flakes as a closely guarded secret; however, experimental evidence by food scientist Ann Reardon shows that the result can be recreated by seizing chocolate (see external link: Chocolate seizing).

Variations

Flake bars
Several varieties of Flake have been produced over the years, including:
Versions based around dark (plain) chocolate
Plain Flake - "A blend of plain and milk chocolate"
Flake Noir - a dark chocolate flake bar.
Flake Dark - dark chocolate flake covered in dark chocolate. Launched 2006.
Flake Snow (known as Snowflake until 2003) - a white chocolate flake bar dipped into milk chocolate. Launched 2000 and discontinued in 2008.
Flake Dipped - milk chocolate flake dipped into milk chocolate (resembles a larger version of Twirl), and also known as Flake Luxury. Launched 2003. 
Flake Praline - milk chocolate flake with praline. Launched 2004.
Flake Bar.
Flake Allure - a milk chocolate flake half enrobed in rich truffle and milk chocolate. Launched 2011 (limited edition).
Orange Flake - orange-flavoured milk chocolate flake (available in South Africa).
Flake Mint - flake which has a pale green mint-flavoured centre. In South Africa it is a mint-flavoured milk chocolate flake with no colouring. Flake Mint was introduced in Australia in late 2016 as a Special Edition flavor.
Flake Caramilk - a Caramilk flavoured Flake composed of caramelised white chocolate introduced in Australia in 2021.

Related products

99 Flake - A short (usually half-length) flake bar, typically served as a garnish on ice cream.
Flake McFlurry original - a McFlurry with crushed bits of flake and chocolate. Limited edition run along with flake McFlurry raspberry.
Flake McFlurry raspberry - a McFlurry with crushed bits of flake, chocolate and raspberry juice. Limited edition run along with original flake McFlurry.
Cadbury Twin Pot Flake
Flake Bites
Flake Minis
Flake Moments

Advertising 

The product gained some notoriety for its highly sensual advertising. In the UK, the advertisements showed people – almost always women – enjoying a Flake whilst relaxing.

The Flake Girl became famous as a symbol of indulgence and secret pleasure. Her emphasis – to a jingle ("Only the crumbliest, flakiest chocolate, tastes like chocolate never tasted before") – was on allowing herself a guilt-free luxury. The advertising of a girl in a field was produced by Barry Myers.

The Flake song was composed by UK jingle writer Ronnie Bond, who also composed "Tasty tasty very very tasty" for Bran Flakes, and "I'd rather have a bowl of Coco Pops" for Coco Pops.

Former Tyrannosaurus Rex percussionist Steve Peregrin Took wrote a song, Peppermint Flickstick, in 1970 as a satire on the campaign.  The song was recorded that year by his band Shagrat and released in 1990.

In 1999, a tribute advertisement to the Flake Girls of decades past was released. The montage began with a clip of the very first Flake Girl advertisement from 1959, followed by a 1965 clip of a girl relaxing in a rowing boat whilst being pestered by a cheeky swan for a peck of her Flake bar. The next clip showed the 1973 advertisement of a doe-eyed artist in a field of poppies painting a watercolour and indulging in a Flake bar, before being caught in a summer shower. This was followed by a clip of the exotic 1987 ad in which a restless woman in silk negligee reposes on a window sill on a sultry night, indulging in a Flake bar whilst a gecko lizard is noted crawling over a ringing telephone. Next was a clip of the classical 1991 Flake advertisement in which a woman sporting a dark, cropped hairstyle reposes in an overflowing bath tub in a great painted hall. Lastly, this tribute montage advertisement ended with the latest Flake Girl advertisement (1999), featuring a Parisienne relaxing in a summery garden overlooking the Eiffel Tower. As she bites into the Flake bar in her ice-cream, the garden sprinklers are set off and she is drenched in refreshing water.

The Flake girl was finally retired after 40 years, in 2004. However, in 2005 she was found to have a 19% recall in the UK population, leading to a revival in 2007. The new advertisement featured Australian model Alyssa Sutherland eating a Flake in a convertible during a shower of rain.

UK singer Joss Stone became the new Flake girl in 2008 – the first non-model to promote the product. In the television advertisement she is seen breaking off a small piece of Flake before popping it into her mouth and brushing the crumbs off her blouse whilst softly singing the Flake theme song.

On 8 June 2010, a new advertisement (first aired on Channel 4) saw a woman float around on a black background. Whilst part of 'The Flake girl' series, there is no mention of any text or slogan aside from the image of the bar at the end of the advertisement, and the familiar music jingle is replaced by a haunting piano piece.

See also
 List of chocolate bar brands
 Mekupelet

References

External links 
Cadbury's Flake 

Products introduced in 1920
British confectionery
Cadbury brands
Chocolate bars
Mondelez International brands